The Ambassador of Malaysia to the Republic of Turkey is the head of Malaysia's diplomatic mission to Turkey. The position has the rank and status of an Ambassador Extraordinary and Plenipotentiary and is based in the Embassy of Malaysia, Ankara.

List of heads of mission

Chargés d'Affaires to Turkey

Ambassadors to Turkey

See also
 Malaysia–Turkey relations

References 

 
Turkey
Malaysia